
 

Lake Plains is a locality in the Australian state of South Australia located about  south of the Adelaide city centre and  northeast of the centre of Goolwa on the west coastline of Lake Alexandrina.

Lake Plains is reported as being a “descriptive name given to a subdivision of section 2113, Hundred of Bremer…”  A school operated there from 1862 to 1942.  Boundaries were created for the “long established name” in August 2000.

The majority land use within the locality is agriculture.  Land use planning is required to take account of flooding due to the route of the Bremer River through the locality to its mouth at Lake Alexandrina.  The coastline of the locality is zoned for conservation due to its location within the Coorong and Lakes Alexandrina and Albert Wetland which is listed both as a Ramsar site and a wetland of national importance.

Lake Plains is located within the federal division of Mayo, the state electoral district of Hammond and the local government area of the Alexandrina Council.

References

Towns in South Australia